Timberjack is a 1955 American Trucolor lumberjack Western film directed by Joseph Kane and starring Sterling Hayden, Vera Ralston, David Brian, Adolphe Menjou, Hoagy Carmichael and Chill Wills. With a very high number of musical sections (including one by Hoagy Carmichael) it approaches a musical in format.

Plot

The film is set in a wilderness area in the north of the United States in the late 19th century. Rival interests in a small town vie for control of the huge forest.

Tim Chipman is an honest lumberman who returns home to find his father murdered. Chipman gets his own back by setting the family timber company against ruthless competitor Croft Brunner. It seems that Brunner is also a rival for the heart of saloon keeper Lynne Tilton. He accidentally kills her father, by punching the old man too hard. Brunner moves the body out of town during the night and dumps it near a river where the men will be logging the next day. He points the blame on rival French loggers. Jingles points out that the father always wore a hat when out, but his hat is missing. Chapman goes to quiz the French loggers.

Lynn accidentally finds her father's hat in Brunner's office and realises that Brunner killed him. She pulls a revolver and shoots him in the left arm and escapes the area with Jingles. Jingles leaves her in the forest. Despite its immense size Brunner manages to quickly track her and they exchange gunfire. She runs down to the railway line where she flags down a tree with Chapman on board.

Chapman ends up in a long distance shoot-out with rifles against Brunner, killing him.

Cast
 Sterling Hayden as Tim Chipman
 Vera Ralston as Lynne Tilton
 David Brian as Croft Brunner
 Adolphe Menjou as 'Sweetwater' Tilton, referred to as "Swifty" throughout the film
 Hoagy Carmichael as Jingles
 Chill Wills as Steve Riika
 Jim Davis as Poole
 Howard Petrie as 'Axe-Handle' Ole
 Ian MacDonald as Pauquette
 Elisha Cook as Punky 
 Karl Davis as Red Bush 
 Wally Cassell as Veazie
 Tex Terry as Charlie

Production
Timberjack was filmed in Glacier National Park and Western Montana using Trucolor film technology.<ref>Movie Review: At Loew's State" New York Times, March 10, 1955 https://www.nytimes.com/movie/review ?res=990DFFD6143EE53ABC4852DFB566838E649EDE</ref> Sterling Hayden and Elisha Cook Jr. would star in Stanley Kubrick's The Killing'' a year later. Adolphe Menjou later appeared in Kubrick's Paths of Glory 1957.

See also
 List of American films of 1955
 Sterling Hayden filmography

References

External links
 
 http://timberjack.info

1955 films
1955 drama films
American drama films
Films directed by Joseph Kane
Films set in forests
Films about lumberjacks
Republic Pictures films
Trucolor films
1950s English-language films
1950s American films